West End Football Club is a football team, based in the Mayhill area of Swansea, Wales. They play in the West Wales Premier League, which is in the fourth tier of the Welsh football pyramid.

History

Formed in 1964 by a group of local enthusiasts in a local public house (The Wellington) which was situated in the west end of Swansea and so the birth of West End AFC.

In 2004–05, the club won the FAW Trophy, defeating Rhydymwyn F.C. at Rhayader.

Notable players
Alan Beer played for West End before later joining Swansea City.

Jazz Richards played for West End before joining Cardiff City's academy

Honours

FAW Trophy – Winners: 2004–05, 2005–06
Welsh Football League
Division 1 – Winners: 2012–13
Division 2 – Winners: 2008–09
Division 3 – Runner Up: 2005–06
Swansea Senior Football League
First Division Champions (13): 1970–71, 1973–74, 1974–75, 1976–77, 1982–83, 1985–86 1994–95; 1996–97; 1997–98; 1998–99; 1999–2000; 2002–03; 2004–05
West Wales Amateur Cup/ Intermediate Cup.
Winners: 1968–69, 1974–75, 1977–78, 1982–83, 1993–94, 1997–98, 2001–02
Runners-up: 1965–66, 1979–80, 1996–97, 1998–99, 2002–03
West Wales Senior Cup
Runners-up: 2008–09

References

Football clubs in Swansea
Association football clubs established in 1964
1964 establishments in Wales
Welsh Football League clubs
Swansea Senior League clubs
Ardal Leagues clubs
West Wales Premier League clubs